Kunov or Cunow (Cyrillic: Кунов) is a Slavic masculine surname, its feminine counterpart is Kunova or Cunowa. Notable people with the surname include:
Alexandra Kunová (born 1992), Slovak figure skater
Elena Kunova (born 1975), Bulgarian volleyball player
Emiliya Kunova (born 1960), Bulgarian athlete
Heinrich Cunow (1862–1936), German politician and Marxist theorist
Lensch-Cunow-Haenisch group